Thomas Crittenden may refer to:

 Thomas Leonidas Crittenden (1819–1893), American Civil War general, lawyer, and politician
 Thomas Theodore Crittenden (1832–1909), Governor of Missouri
 Thomas Turpin Crittenden (1825–1905), American Civil War general
 Thomas T. Crittenden Jr. (1863–1938), mayor of Kansas City, Missouri